Salmonella enterica subsp. enterica is a subspecies of Salmonella enterica, the rod-shaped, flagellated, aerobic, Gram-negative bacterium. Many of the pathogenic serovars of the S. enterica species are in this subspecies, including that responsible for typhoid.

Serovars
S. enterica subsp. enterica contains a large number of serovars which can infect a broad range of vertebrate hosts. The individual members range from being highly host-adapted (only able to infect a narrow range of species) to displaying a broad host range. A number of techniques are currently used to differentiate between serotypes. These include looking for the presence or absence of antigens, phage typing, molecular fingerprinting and biotyping, where serovars are differentiated by which nutrients they are able to ferment. A possible factor in determining the host range of particular serovars is phage-mediated acquisition of a small number of genetic elements that enable infection of a particular host. It is further postulated that serovars which infect a narrow range of species have diverged from ancestors with a broad host range, and have since specialised and lost the ability to infect some hosts.

A selection of serovars, with known hosts listed. Since there are more than 2500 serovars of Salmonella enterica subsp. enterica, this list is incomplete.

A study of data from 37 countries collected between 2001 and 2007 found that the most common serovar of Salmonella isolated from human cases was Enteritidis, found in an average of 43.5% of cases, followed by Typhimurium (17.1% of cases), Newport (3.5%), Infantis (1.8%), Virchow (1.5%), Hadar (1.5%), and Agona (0.8%).

One strain of Salmonella that has recently been emerging in the United States is S. enterica ser. Javiana. "An outbreak occurred in 2002, there were 141 cases that occurred among the participants of the U.S. Transplant Games. Out of the 141 cases, most of the cases were either transplant recipients (34%) or people receiving immunosuppressive therapy (32%)". There is an increasing number of Salmonella serotypes that are multidrug resistant (MDR), which was identified by the CDC's National Antimicrobial Resistance Monitoring System. "SalmonellaJaviana  causes 4% of non-typhodial Salmonella infections in the United States each year."

In November 2016, a new strain of extensively drug resistant (XDR) Salmonella enterica serovar Typhi emerged in Pakistan, primarily from the cities of Hyderabad and Karachi. Multidrug resistant strains have been present since the late 1970s in Africa and Asia. These XDR strains are resistant to all antibiotic treatment options: chloramphenicol, ampicillin, trimethoprim-sulfamethoxazole, fluoroquinolones, and third-generation cephalosporins. The outbreak has been ongoing since 2016.

Metabolism
Genetic evidence suggests that the serovars can be divided into two groups – one which causes enteric infection and has a broad repertoire of metabolic capabilities, and one which usually causes invasive infection, often in a narrow range of hosts, and shows degradation of anaerobic metabolic pathways. It is thought that these metabolic capabilities are important for obtaining nutrients in the challenging and nutrient-limited inflamed gut environment.

Nomenclature
The serovars can be designated fully or in a shortened form.  The short form lists the genus, Salmonella, which is followed by the capitalized not italicized serovar, e.g. Salmonella Typhi  whereas, full designation for Salmonella Typhi is Salmonella enterica subsp. enterica serovar Typhi.  Each serovar can have many strains, as well, which allows for a rapid increase in the total number of antigenically variable bacteria.

Epidemiology 

Invasive strains of non-typhoidal Salmonella, such as Salmonella Typhimurium ST313 have recently been labelled as causing emerging diseases in Africa. Key host immune deficiencies associated with HIV, malaria and malnutrition have contributed to a wide spread of this disease and the need to use expensive antimicrobial drugs in the poorest health services in the world. But also bacterial factors, such as upregulated activity of the virulence gene pgtE, due to a single nucleotide polymorphism (SNP) in its promoter region, have been shown to have a great impact upon the pathogenesis of this particular Salmonella sequence type.

References 

Salmonella
Typhoid fever
Infectious causes of cancer
Subspecies